Jacqueline de Rojas  (born Jacqueline Yu 1962) is president of techUK and chair of the board of Digital Leaders. She serves as Non-Executive Director on the boards of Rightmove, Costain Group and FDM Group, and was formally on the board of AO World. She also works for the Department for Digital, Culture, Media and Sport. She serves as co-Chair for the Institute of Coding and was awarded an honorary Doctorate of Engineering from the University of Bath in 2020.

Early life and education 
de Rojas was born Jacqueline Yu in Folkestone to a Chinese father and British mother. Her mother was a victim of domestic violence, and together with de Rojas escaped to Swindon to live with her grandparents. de Rojas has stated that her father was abusive and that her stepfather "behaved inappropriately" towards her. She completed a degree in European business at Middlesex University and Reutlingen University in 1986. She joined Synon to grow their overseas distribution network starting in Germany and including Northern Europe and Asia.

Career 
de Rojas has worked in various blue chip software companies, including CA Technologies. She joined Citrix Systems as vice president for Northern Europe in 2014. She pushed for more flexible working to increase productivity. She left Citrix to join Sage Group in 2016, and stepped down after 6 months.  She published a Women in Tech Manifesto for techUK in 2014 and was appointed President of techUK in 2015. techUK represent over 900 UK-based tech companies. 

In 2017 de Rojas joined Costain Group as non-executive director. That year she became Chair of Digital Leaders, a global initiative that promotes effective digital transformation. She is the Chair of Digital Leaders UK, an online platform that provides opinion and advice on technology. She was on The Prince's Trust committee for several years and managed The Technology Leadership Group. de Rojas was appointed as an advisor to the Board of financial analytics company Metapraxis in 2018. She launched the Institute of Coding with the University of Bath in 2018. The Institute of Coding is a national consortium of industry and academia, working together to address to the UK digital skills gap. de Rojas serves as co-Chair of the Institute of Coding's Governance Board. 

She was interviewed by Lauren Laverne for Desert Island Discs in March 2019.

In September 2019, de Rojas was appointed as a non-executive director of FDM Group.

Advocacy 
de Rojas, who has been described in media as a British Asian woman, is a campaigner for increased cultural diversity in technology. She is an ambassador for Girl Guides, the 30 % club and the Founder's Forum AccelerateHer. In 2018 she advised the GirlGuides on their new STEM badge.  She spoke at the MTV Young Women in Business conference in June 2018. She serves as a judge for the Northern Tech Awards.

Born Jacqueline Yu, she has spoken out about the discrimination she faced because she is half-Chinese, and said that after her first marriage, she changed her surname to "Jones", to "fit in".

Awards and honours 
2015 Computer Weekly Most Influential Woman in IT
2016 Debrett's 500 People of Influence
2017 Catherine Variety Award for UK Science and Technology 
2018 Appointed Commander of the Most Excellent Order of the British Empire (CBE) in the 2018 New Year Honours
2018 Women in IT Awards Advocate of the Year
2018 Computer Weekly Most Influential Women in UK IT Hall of Fame
2019 100 Most Influential People in Global Digital Government
2019 Technology and Digital prize at The Asian Women of Achievement Awards
2020 Received honorary Doctorate of Engineering from the University of Bath
2021 Stroeous Award Winner: Global Positive Impact Leader of the Year

References

Women chief executives
Alumni of Middlesex University
Commanders of the Order of the British Empire
1962 births
Living people